Gene Taylor (February 10, 1928 – October 27, 1998) was a Republican U.S. representative from Missouri.

He was born near Sarcoxie, Missouri, where Taylor attended local public schools.
He attended Southwest Missouri State College, Springfield from 1945 to 1947 then served in the One Hundred and Eighth Cavalry, Missouri National Guard from 1948 to 1949.

From 1954 to 1960, he served as mayor of Sarcoxie, Missouri while starting his automobile dealership which he ran until 1973. He served as a delegate to Republican National Conventions between 1960 and 1968 and as a delegate to Missouri State Republican conventions in 1960, 1964, 1968, and 1972. He was also a Republican national committeeman from 1966 to 1972.

Taylor was first elected to Congress in 1972, defeating future U.S. Attorney General John Ashcroft in the primary, and was subsequently re-elected to the seven succeeding congresses, though he was nearly defeated in 1974 and 1982. He was not a candidate for renomination in 1988 to the 101st Congress. He died on October 27, 1998, in Springfield, Missouri.

The main post office in Springfield, Missouri is named the Gene Taylor Building in the congressman's honor.

References

External links
 

1928 births
1998 deaths
20th-century American politicians
American automobile salespeople
Mayors of places in Missouri
Missouri National Guard personnel
Missouri State University alumni
People from Jasper County, Missouri
Republican National Committee members
Republican Party members of the United States House of Representatives from Missouri